Tamazulapam may refer to any of the following towns in Oaxaca, Mexico:

Tamazulapam del Espíritu Santo
Tamazulapam del Progreso
Santo Tomás Tamazulapan